Black maternal mortality in the United States refers to the death of women, specifically those who identify as Black or African American, during or after child delivery. In general, maternal death can be due to a myriad of factors, such as how the nature of the pregnancy or the delivery itself, but is not associated with unintentional or secondary causes. In the United States, around 700 women die from pregnancy-related illnesses or complications per year. This number does not include the approximately 50,000 women who experience life-threatening complications during childbirth, resulting in lifelong disabilities and complications. However, there are stark differences in maternal mortality rates for Black American women versus Indigenous American, Alaska Native, and White American women.

There have been significant differences between the maternal mortality of white women versus Black women throughout history. In the U.S., the CDC reported that Black women experience maternal mortality two to three times higher than that of white women. The estimated national maternal mortality rate in the United States is about 17 per 100,000 live births––but it is about 43 per 100,000 live births for Black women. Furthermore, data from the CDC Pregnancy Surveillance Study shows that these higher rates of Black maternal mortality are due to higher fatality rates, not a higher number of cases. Since the usual causes of maternal mortality are conditions that occur or are exacerbated during pregnancy, most instances of maternal mortality are preventable deaths.

Recently, these statistics have been receiving more recognition, as researchers place more emphasis on minimizing racial/ethnic disparities seen in maternal mortality. Researchers have identified several reasons for the Black-white maternal mortality disparity in the U.S., including factors like access to healthcare, socioeconomic status, pre-existing conditions, medical racism, racial history, and access to abortion - all of which are social determinants of health in the United States. Preventative measures have been taken at an institutional level and medical level, by the creation of healthcare initiatives as well as policies that are in place.

Historical context

Distrust of health institutions 

The historical context of institutionalized racism in the United States has had the effect of black people having to deal with medical and scientific racism, making the black community less likely to trust medical institutions and professionals, due to previous exploitation and abuse. Institutionalized racism is defined as policies and practices that exist across an entire society or organization and result in and support a continued unfair advantage for some people and unfair or harmful treatment of others based on race. For many years, African Americans in medicine and healthcare have faced racial injustices. Understanding what factors contribute to the racial disparity in maternal health outcomes is critical because it can illuminate where and how to address such a complex issue and focus the scope of public health prevention programs Slavery had caused black bodies to be seen as less then—something that could be used for entertainment or exploitation. An article in the American Journal of Public Health describes that laws making enslavement an inheritable status increased the scrutiny of black women and forced them into bearing children for the economic gain of their enslavers. In addition, many medical and surgical techniques were developed by exploiting the bodies of enslaved black women.

Sarah Baartman was a Hottentot woman who was paraded around in circuses around 1810-1820. She was taken from the Cape to London, presented as the "Hottentot Venus" on account of the fact that her buttocks were considered abnormally large by Europeans. After her death, French scientist George Carvier anatomized her body in order to measure her genitalia along with other body parts. A cast of her body, skeleton, brain, and a wax mold of her genitalia were once on display in a museum.

The Tuskegee Syphilis Study occurred from 1932 until 1972, where 600 economically disadvantaged African American men were unknowingly used by researchers to track the progression of syphilis, resulting in subjects going blind, insane, or experiencing other severe health problems.

A more mild, but equally horrifying example of Black bodies being exploited is Henrietta Lacks, a Black woman who had samples taken of her cancerous cells without her knowledge. This tissue was given to researcher George Gey. It was found that Lacks' cells have a remarkable capability to survive and reproduce. For years after her death, scientists continued to use her cells, released her name, and released medical records to the media without her family's consent. This legacy has persisted into modern times and has made Black women less likely to trust the medical community. The battle of Henrietta's bodily rights is not over yet though. On October 4, 2021, the Lacks' estate announced that they will be suing the biotechnology company named Thermo Fisher Scientific Inc., who says they have the intellectual rights of the HeLa cells. Lawyers for Henrietta's surviving family say the biotechnology company has continued to profit off the cells well after the origins of the HeLa cell line became well known. "The exploitation of Henrietta Lacks represents the unfortunately common struggle experienced by Black people throughout history," the suit says. The blatant disregard of the worth of Black people in healthcare has left Black people more untrusting of medical institutions, and provides more context into why Black mother may be perishing at a higher rate.

Causes

Access to maternal care 

The setting where a woman gives birth is another significant factor in determining the outcome of the birth. Specifically, non-teaching, black-serving hospitals have been found to extremely increase the rate of morbidity for black women during pregnancy. In the states of Pennsylvania, Missouri, and California, the journal article “Black-white disparities in maternal in-hospital mortality according to teaching and black-serving hospital status” discovered that between the years of 1995 to 2000, out of every 100,000 patients in a hospital, 11.5 black women died during pregnancy, and 4.8 white women died during pregnancy. The figures show that the data for maternal morbidity from a black woman to a white woman almost doubled, and they are mainly attributed to whether the hospital is teaching or non-teaching and whether it is a black serving hospital (Burris 2021). “Mortality rates among u.s. women of reproductive age” also found that the greatest risk for mortality during pregnancy resulted in deaths from women’s health outcomes over the course of their lifetime which can also be largely attributed to the healthcare settings that are accessible for all pregnant women (Gemmill, 2022). According to “Urban-rural differences in pregnancy-related deaths,” within urban-rural communities, black women had higher mortality ratios within the same age groups compared to non-hispanic Americans proving the necessity for accessible healthcare for all pregnant women regardless of their environment or setting (Merkt, 2021). All these contributing factors represent the varying barriers that can occur based on the setting of the patient and hospital/healthcare center during pregnancy. 

Both prenatal care and postnatal are used to support pregnant women at different stages and monitor potential risk factors in order to make pregnancy and delivery as safe and healthy as possible. The literature shows that increasing access to prenatal care through public health departments caused a subsequent decrease in black maternal mortality rates. Furthermore, having fewer than 5 prenatal care visits, not attending prenatal care appointments, and accessing prenatal care later in a pregnancy are associated with maternal mortality. Black women are less likely to initiate prenatal care, with 10% of black women receiving late (third trimester) or no prenatal care, compared with 4% of white women.

"Maternal care deserts" are an important factor when it comes to access to prenatal and postnatal care. A maternal care desert is defined as a county with no hospital offering obstetric care and no OB/GYN or certified nurse midwife providers. Around 15 million women live in these maternity care deserts, with many of these women being minorities. A study done on the relation of maternal care deserts and pregnancy associated mortality found that "the risk of death during pregnancy and up to 1 year postpartum owing to any cause (pregnancy-associated mortality) and in particular death owing to obstetric causes (pregnancy-related mortality) was significantly elevated among women residing in maternity care deserts compared with women in areas with greater access." Other obstacles such as lack of providers accepting public insurance such as Medicaid and transportation requirements to get to prenatal appointments affect black women more than white women in the United States.

Intersection of race, socioeconomic status, and disability 
Income has been well studied as a social determinant of health, and it has been found that worse health outcomes at all-time points surrounding pregnancy are associated with lower socioeconomic status and income levels. Lack of insurance/using Medicaid and experiencing homelessness are associated with severe morbidity rates, and are all more likely to apply to black women and increase their risk of maternal death.

Systemic racism contributes to the greater likelihood of black women to belong to lower socioeconomic classes. However, it is important to note that Black women across all socioeconomic statuses and education levels experience the same extent of racism both during the birthing process and after, as noted in Black women’s experiences in the Neonatal Intensive Care Unit following birth.  A study from the Nature Public Health Collection journal pointed out that the COVID-19 pandemic increases the vulnerability of black women who are more likely to work at jobs that carry greater exposure risks to COVID-19, and more likely to lose income due to unemployment. This is in addition to the pandemic making accessing perinatal care more challenging, and making income disparities even more stark. The researchers who authored this study recommend that the interlocking factors affecting black mothers during the COVID-19 pandemic be specifically addressed in order to see tangible improvements in maternal health outcomes.

More and more women with disabilities are becoming mothers, but few federally-funded programs or support services to women with disabilities. Black mothers with disabilities have increased barriers to accessing maternal services, which increases health and mortality risks for the mother. Women with disabilities also have higher pregnancy complications, preterm deliveries, and low birth infants.

One of the most determinant factors on the outcome of a woman’s pregnancy has been statistically proven to be the healthcare that the mother has access to. According to “Race, medicaid coverage, and equity in maternal morbidity,” there is a large disproportion of mothers receiving adverse reactions during or after pregnancy with Medicaid compared to those with private insurance. This research found that black women with medicaid are .5 times more likely to have severe maternal mortality. In this study, most of the white women had private insurance which resulted in them being half as likely to have a severe maternal morbidity experience compared to black women with Medicaid (Brown, 2021). According to “Incidence of severe maternal morbidity by race and payer status at an academic medical system,” by doing a similar study, it was established that black women with Medicaid have the highest rates of mortality, and white women with private insurance have the lowest rates of mortality proving the insurance that the pregnant mother has is one of the main determinants in their healthcare outcome (Mallampati, 2022).

Pre-existing conditions 
A study conducted by Amy Metcalfe, James Wick, and Paul Ronksley analyzing trends in maternal mortality from 1993 to 2012 showed that the percentage of black women with pre-existing conditions increased from about 10% to about 17%, the highest out of all other racial and ethnic groups in the United States. Black women are more likely to have adverse pregnancy outcomes which make them more susceptible to cardiovascular diseases putting them at a greater risk for material mortality. Black women are also more likely to already have pre-existing cardiovascular disease. They also have a greater odd of developing preeclampsia, along with an increased prevalence of chronic disease and obesity. Black women are more likely to have unplanned pregnancies as well–and are thus more likely to lack prior monitoring and treatment of pre-existing conditions before, during, and after a pregnancy.
A study conducted in 2009 also showed that black infant mortality rates were five times higher than white infant mortality rates. The health of newborn children has a direct correlation to the physical health of the mother through reproduction, pregnancy and birth,  which provides further evidence of poor maternal health resources and care received by black mothers.

Racial bias 

In 2020 the American Public Health Association declared structural racism a public health crisis, which was attributed to historical forces as well as current events.
There has been thousands of studies analyzing the racial bias against Black people in the healthcare system. Overall, Blacks are less likely to receive the same quality care as their White counterparts. Clinician bias is one of the largest contributors to this disparity. This bias can be either implicit or explicit, but both are harmful to the well-being of Black patients. Explicit biases have generally been measured with self-reports while implicit biases are measured through "validated tests of unconscious association". A lot of empirical evidence strongly suggests that White physicians hold negative implicit racial biases and negative explicit racial stereotypes, which causes them to be influenced by these biases when it comes to making medical decisions for their patients. In turn, this contributes to the racial inequities prominent in the healthcare system.

In general, Black Americans are under-treated for pain when compared with White Americans. Black patients are less likely to receive pain medication, and when they do, they are more likely to receive a lower quantity than their White counterparts. This phenomenon contributes to Black maternal mortality, aiding in the dismissal of Black women's pain by medical professionals. A Harvard School of Public Health publication discussed this phenomenon by collecting numerous examples of medical professionals being dismissive or providing delayed care to Black mothers expressing pain or problematic symptoms. The publication tells the story of Shalon Irving, a Black woman who experienced symptoms such as high blood pressure, blurry vision, and hematoma after childbirth. However, her doctors advised her to not take further action, and Irving died soon after. According to the author, this was just one instance of medical caregivers being less likely to take Black women's concerns seriously, contributing to maternal death.

Maternal morality is connected to racism, with Black women dying from medical issues that are preventable yet not being listened to when they complain about pain. More specifically along the lines of black maternal health, black women are also seen to receive birth control-related distrust in higher frequencies compared to white women. Although the likelihood of poor Black women are more susceptible to the reality of maternal mortality, the risk still exists for other Black women with better resources. For example, world-renowned tennis athlete Serena Williams almost suffered a fatality postpartum when she got a pulmonary embolism. This was a result of the doctors not listening to her when she expressed her health concerns, and not considering those concerns serious enough to be acted upon urgently. According to a study done by the Robert Johnson Fund, over 22% of Black women report discrimination from medical professionals when they are seeking help.

Abortion access 
Unsafe abortion is a major contributing factor to maternal mortality and morbidity and Black women, who are more likely to have unplanned pregnancies and be of lower socioeconomic status, are more likely to undergo unsafe abortions. Black women have consistently had higher abortion rates than White women, which means that restrictions to safe abortions will disproportionately affect them. And over the last couple of years, access to safe abortions in the United States has become increasingly restrictive. These restrictions include bans on particular methods of abortion care, Targeted Restriction of Abortion Provider (TRAP) laws, and specifically trigger laws which have banned abortion in some states immediately after Roe v. Wade was overturned in 2022. The lack of access to safe abortions have been exacerbated within the past decades as states pass strict regulations around abortion especially in southern states with higher proportions of African Americans. The World Health Organization recognizes that in order to help decrease maternal mortality, access to safe abortions must be increased. And while few studies have inquired as to whether there is a direct link between unsafe abortion and maternal mortality, the studies that have been done support this link.

Preventative measures

Medical 
In order to prevent maternal deaths from occurring, methods have been identified which decrease maternal mortality overall along with the accompanying health disparities. Researchers believe that by improving the quality of care within hospitals, maternal mortality would be properly addressed and accounted for. It has been suggested that higher quality hospitals, that have multiple layers of care such as administrative and patient advocates, are consistent with their collection of feedback from patients which allows for further improvement in regards to addressing maternal mortality. Additionally, maternal health-related services, such as an intensive care unit, 24-hour anesthesia, and OB/GYN specialists, contribute to the decrease of maternal mortality rate. With the prioritization of standardized care and early risk factors, issues that may lead to maternal mortality in Black women, such as hypertension, hemorrhaging, and eclampsia, would be directly addressed. The new study also found that these disparities were concentrated in a few causes of death. Postpartum cardiomyopathy (heart failure) and the blood pressure disorders preeclampsia and eclampsia were the leading causes of maternal death in Black women, with mortality rates five times higher than in white women. Pregnant and postpartum Black women were also more than twice as likely as white women to die from hemorrhage or embolism (blood vessel blockage). It is also important to recognize that only 87% of Black women have health insurance and most have gaps in coverage at some point in their lives. To improve the health of Black women, policies need to be implemented that focus on the expansion and maintenance of the care and coverage. In addition to improving medical care for black women, improving the living conditions of black families would also help to eliminate declining physical health conditions, as the health of communities has been proven to link directly to the overall health of the individuals who live thereInstitutional

Some have argued against the conventional classification of race as a risk factor in health, instead calling for the recognition of racism and poverty as the underlying factors contributing to Black maternal mortality and other poor health outcomes for Black individuals. To address the medical racism that exists within healthcare, which ultimately leads to maternal mortality, many states and cities have taken initiative by creating programs to address the high levels of Black maternal mortality. Most notably, in 2018, an initiative was created in New York City in which healthcare workers had to undergo implicit bias training. In addition, experts in multiple sectors, such as medicine, sociology, and law, have said that deliberately addressing racism, both within and outside of the medical field, is necessary to decrease the rate of Black maternal mortality.
According to “Epidemiology of racial/ethnic disparities in severe maternal morbidity and mortality,” screenings are a large component of prevention for severe maternal morbidity which directly correlates to the increase in black mortality during pregnancy as well as access to resources (Holdt, 2017). This likely attributes to the also significant gap from black to white pregnancies to be readmitted post-pregnancy. Using the National (Nationwide) Impatient Sample from the Healthcare Cost and Utilization Project from 2012-2014 discovered that black women are found that women were more likely to be readmitted postpartum, to suffer severe maternal morbidity, and suffer life-threatening complications (Aziz, 2019). By increasing screening before and during pregnancy and access to better maternal healthcare for those with Medicaid, maternal mortality for black women and post-pregnancy complications could significantly decrease; in addition, new protocols regarding how often pregnant women, especially black women, should be screened for hypertensive disorders while pregnant and defended by institutionalization, possibly by litigation.

Pregnancy-Related Mortality Ratio (PRMR) data by state 

PRMR is the number of pregnancy-related deaths per 100,000 live births.

Many states do not report maternal mortality data by race/ethnicity.

See also 
Death of Chaniece Wallace
Death of Sha-Asia Washington
Weathering hypothesis
Maternal Health
Race and maternal health in the United States

References 

Race and health in the United States
Maternity in the United States
African-American history
Maternal death